Joe Cordina (born 1 December 1991) is an active Welsh former boxing world champion. Cordina held the IBF super-featherweight title in 2022. At regional level, he held the British and Commonwealth lightweight titles between 2018 and 2019. As an amateur, he won a bronze medal at the 2014 Commonwealth Games and gold at the 2015 European Championships, both in the lightweight division. He also represented Great Britain at the 2016 Summer Olympics.

Personal life
Cordina is of Maltese heritage. In 2015 he had a daughter.

Amateur career
At the 2011 AIBA World Boxing Championships in Baku, Azerbaijan, he lost in the first round of the lightweight event to Eugen Burhard of Germany by a score of 7–13. In 2012 Cordina won a bronze medal at the European Under-22 Boxing Championships held in Russia. He defeated German boxer Artur Bril in his quarterfinal bout before losing 13–12 to Russian Maksim Shmiglev in the semi-finals. He was eliminated from the 2013 AIBA World Boxing Championships after losing his first bout in the lightweight event to Lázaro Álvarez of Cuba. At the 2012 European Boxing Olympic Qualification Tournament he was eliminated after his bout against David Joyce of Ireland was stopped in the third round.

He represented Wales at the 2014 Commonwealth Games held in Glasgow, Scotland. Competing in the men's lightweight division he defeated Pat McCormack of England in the first round, the Canada's David Gauthier in the round of 16. In the quarterfinals he defeated Chad Milnes of New Zealand, guaranteeing himself at least a bronze medal. He lost his semi-final to Scotland's Charlie Flynn by a split judge's decision and was eliminated from the tournament, to finish with a bronze medal.

Cordina won the lightweight gold medal at the 2015 European Amateur Boxing Championships in Samokov, Bulgaria, beating Otan Eranosyan of Georgia in the final. He was the only British boxer to win a gold medal at the event. At the 2015 AIBA World Boxing Championships held in Doha, Qatar, he reached the quarterfinals of the lightweight division by beating Kwon Chol-guk of North Korea in the round of 16, but was then eliminated after losing to Robson Conceição of Brazil.

He boxed at the 2016 European Boxing Olympic Qualification Tournament in Samsun, Turkey. He secured qualification for the lightweight event at the 2016 Summer Olympics in Rio de Janeiro, Brazil, by beating David Joyce, who had eliminated him from the 2012 Olympic qualification tournament, in the semi-finals.

Professional career

Cordina vs. Aguilar 
Cordina made his professional debut as a super-featherweight on 22 April 2017 at the Echo Arena, Liverpool, scoring a fourth-round technical knockout (TKO) victory over José Aguilar in a scheduled four round contest.

Cordina vs. Vib 
Cordina next faced Sergej Vib on 29 April 2017, on the Anthony Joshua vs. Wladimir Klitschko undercard. He won the fight by a first-round technical knockout.

Cordina vs. Thorne 
Cordina faced Josh Thorne on 27 May 2017, in his third professional bout. He won it by a first-round stoppage, as Thorne retired at the end of the opening round.

Cordina vs. Speight 
Cordina faced Jamie Speight on 1 September 2017, and extended his winning streak to four fights.

Cordina vs. Cantillano 
Cordina faced Lester Cantillano on 28 October 2017 on the Anthony Joshua vs. Carlos Takam undercard. He won the fight on points, which was the first decision victory of his professional career.

Cordina vs. Connelly 
Cordina faced Lee Connelly on 13 December 2017, in his final fight of the year. He won the fight by a fourth-round technical knockout.

Cordina vs. Ben 
Cordina was booked to face Hakim Ben Ali for the vacant WBA International lightweight title on 31 March 2018, on the Anthony Joshua vs. Joseph Parker undercard. He won the fight by a third-round technical knockout.

Cordina vs. Dodd 
Cordina made his first regional title defense against Sean Dodd on 4 August 2018, in a fight which was simultaneously a bout for the vacant Commonwealth lightweight title as well. He won the fight by unanimous decision, with scores of 117–112, 119–109 and 120–109.

Cordina vs. Townend 
Cordina faced Andy Townend on 20 April 2019 in his first Commonwealth title defense. The vacant British lightweight title was on the line as well. He won the fight by a sixth-round technical knockout.

Cordina vs. Gwynne 
Cordina made the first defense of the British and Commonwealth titles on 31 August 2019. He won the fight by unanimous decision, with scores of 116–110, 116–111 and 116–110.

Cordina vs. Tinoco 
Cordina was scheduled to fight Enrique Tinoco for the vacant WBA Continental super-featherweight title on 30 November 2019. He won the fight by unanimous decision, with two judges scoring the fight 98–92 in his favor, while the third judge scored it 96–94 for him.

Cordina vs. Kourbanov 
Cordina faced Faroukh Kourbanov on 20 March 2021, following a 16-month absence from the sport. He won the fight by a close majority decision, with scores of 96–95, 96–96 and 98–93.

Cordina vs. Hernandez 
Cordina next faced Joshuah Hernandez on 14 August 2021. He won the fight by a first-round knockout, stopping Hernandez after just 53 seconds.

Cordina vs. Khatchatryan 
Cordina made his first WBA Continental title defense against Miko Khatchatryan on 11 December 2021, over two years after he had won it. He won the fight by unanimous decision, with two judges scoring the fight 98–92 for him, while the third judge scored it 100–90 in his favor.

Cordina vs. Ogawa 
Cordina KO'd Kenichi Ogawa in the second round to become the IBF super featherweight champion on 4 June 2022, at the Motorpoint Arena in Cordina's native Cardiff, Wales.

Cordina was next scheduled to defend his belt against Shavkat Rakhimov on 5 November, 2022. Due to a hand injury, Cordina had to pull out of the fight and was subsequently stripped of his IBF belt.

Professional boxing record

See also

 List of Welsh boxing world champions
 List of world super-featherweight boxing champions
List of British world boxing champions

References

External links

Joe Cordina - Profile, News Archive & Current Rankings at Box.Live

|-

|-

1991 births
Living people
Welsh male boxers
Boxers from Cardiff
Lightweight boxers
Commonwealth Games bronze medallists for Wales
Boxers at the 2014 Commonwealth Games
Commonwealth Games medallists in boxing
Boxers at the 2016 Summer Olympics
Olympic boxers of Great Britain
Welsh people of Maltese descent
Commonwealth Boxing Council champions
British Boxing Board of Control champions
World super-featherweight boxing champions
International Boxing Federation champions
Medallists at the 2014 Commonwealth Games